The 2019–20 Fairleigh Dickinson Knights men's basketball team represented Fairleigh Dickinson University during the 2019–20 NCAA Division I men's basketball season. The team was led by seventh-year head coach Greg Herenda. The Knights played their home games at the Rothman Center in Hackensack, New Jersey as members of the Northeast Conference. They finished the season 11–19, 9–9 in NEC play to finish in a tie for fifth place. They lost in the quarterfinals of the NEC tournament to LIU.

Previous season 
The Knights finished the 2018–19 season 21–14, 12–6 in NEC play to finish in a tie for first place. They defeated Wagner, Robert Morris, and Saint Francis (PA) to capture the NEC tournament championship as the 2-seed. By winning the NEC tournament, the Knights received the conference's automatic bid and defeated Prairie View A&M in the First Four Round of the NCAA tournament in Dayton, OH. The Knights then lost to  1-seed Gonzaga.

Roster

Schedule and results

|-
!colspan=9 style=| Exhibition

|-
!colspan=9 style=| Non-conference regular season  
  

   

|-
!colspan=9 style=| NEC regular season

|-
!colspan=9 style=| NEC tournament

References

Fairleigh Dickinson Knights men's basketball seasons
Fairleigh Dickinson
Fairleigh Dickinson
Fairleigh Dickinson